Typhlodaphne is a genus of sea snails, marine gastropod mollusks in the family Borsoniidae.

Description
The smooth protoconch is bluntly rounded and paucispiral, consisting of two whorls. The sinus is subsutural, steeply descending and then produced forward to meet the arcuately produced outer lip. The vestigial operculum may reflect an archaic condition.

Species
Species within the genus Typhlodaphne include:
 Typhlodaphne corpulenta (Watson, 1881)
 Typhlodaphne filostriata (Strebel, 1905)
 Typhlodaphne paratenoceras (Powell, 1951) 
 Typhlodaphne payeni (Rochebrune & Mabille, 1885)
 Typhlodaphne platamodes (Watson, 1881)
 Typhlodaphne purissima (Strebel, 1908)
 Typhlodaphne strebeli Powell, 1951
Species brought into synonymy
 Typhlodaphne innocentia Dell, 1990: synonym of Pleurotomella innocentia (Dell, 1990) (original combination)
 Typhlodaphne nipri Numanami, 1996: synonym of Pleurotomella nipri (Numanami, 1996) (original combination)
 Typhlodaphne translucida (Watson, 1881): synonym of Xanthodaphne translucida (Watson, 1881)

References

External links
 Powell A. W. B. (1951). Antarctic and Subantarctic Mollusca: Pelecypoda and Gastropoda. Discovery Reports, 26: 47-196, pl. 5-10
  Bouchet P., Kantor Yu.I., Sysoev A. & Puillandre N. (2011) A new operational classification of the Conoidea. Journal of Molluscan Studies 77: 273-308
 
 Kantor Y.I., Harasewych M.G. & Puillandre N. (2016). A critical review of Antarctic Conoidea (Neogastropoda). Molluscan Research. 36(3): 153-206

 
Gastropod genera